Pechey is a rural locality in the Toowoomba Region, Queensland, Australia. In the  Pechey had a population of 105 people.

Geography
The New England Highway passes through the centre of the town, and the Pechey-Maclagan Road exits to the west.  Pechey State Forest occupies the entire south east corner of the area.

History

The town was named after Edward Wilmot Pechey (Member of the Queensland Legislative Assembly for the Electoral district of Aubigny 1873-1877). He was also a surveyor and sawmill owner. 

Pechey Provisional School opened on 19 March 1889. On 1 January 1909 it became Pechey State School. It closed in 1959.

St Faith's Anglican Church was dedicated on 10 September 1911 by the Venerable Archdeacon Arthur Rivers. In February 1931 it was relocated to Virginia (now Pierces Creek), where it was re-dedicated on 1 March 1930 by Archdeacon Glover.

Pechey Post Office opened on 1 July 1927 (a receiving office had been open from 1888) and closed in 1971.

In the  Pechey had a population of 105 people.

Heritage listings
Pechey has a number of heritage-listed sites, including:
 New England Highway: Pechey Forestry Arboretum

References

Towns in Queensland
Toowoomba Region
Localities in Queensland